Refuge Denied is the debut studio album by American heavy metal band Sanctuary, released in 1988.

Background
After having recorded their first demo, guitarist Lenny Rutledge managed to establish contact with singer and guitarist Dave Mustaine after a show of his band, Megadeth. Mustaine expressed interest in the demo and in acting as producer. Mustaine's manager at the time, Keith Rawls, financed the recording and finally became Sanctuary's manager. Talks to a number of record labels led to the signing with Epic.

Release
The album initially sold 7,000 copies on vinyl. By June 2011, the album had sold over 200,000 copies.

The song "Battle Angels" was used in the 2009 video game Brütal Legend.

The album was re-released in 2010 together with successor album Into the Mirror Black as double CD by reissue label IronBird via Cherry Red.

The song “Battle Angels” was featured in the fourth episode of the first season of the Netflix series, The OA, “Away”.

Track listing

Personnel

Sanctuary
 Warrel Dane – vocals
 Lenny Rutledge – guitar, backing vocals
 Sean Blosl – guitar, backing vocals
 Jim Sheppard – bass
 Dave Budbill – drums, backing vocals

Additional musicians
 Dave Mustaine – backing vocals, guitar solo (6), production
 James Overaa (credited as James Overa) – backing vocals
 Rich Furtner – backing vocals

Technical personnel
 Paul Lani – production (6), mixing
 Terry Date – engineering
 Mike Amstadt – assistant engineering
 Don Grierson – executive production
 Lynn DeBon – photography
 Ed Repka – cover art

References

1988 debut albums
Sanctuary (band) albums
Epic Records albums
Albums produced by Paul Lani
Albums with cover art by Ed Repka